Power pop is a music genre which is a more aggressive form of pop rock. Although its mainstream success peaked in the late 1970s and early 1980s, the genre continues to influence new artists.

The following list is divided in two sections. The first section includes notable power pop bands and solo artists, while the second section includes power pop songs by power pop artists, as well as power pop songs by artists whose main music genre is not power pop. Solo artists are listed alphabetically by last name, and groups are listed alphabetically by the first letter (not including the article "the").

Artists

0–9

5 Seconds of Summer
20/20
The 88

A

The Academy Is...
Admiral Twin
Antic Cafe
Artist vs. Poet
Ash
Jon Auer

B

Badfinger
The Bangles
The Barracudas
Stiv Bators
Bay City Rollers
The Beat
Beathoven
Chris Bell
Ben Folds Five
Brendan Benson
Big Star
Bleu
Blink-182
Blondie
Blue Ash
The Bongos
The Boys
The Breakaways
Busted

C

The Cars
Cavedogs
Cheap Girls
Cheap Trick
Alex Chilton
The Click Five
Paul Collins
Cotton Mather
Marshall Crenshaw
The Cretones
Mikal Cronin

D

The Dandy Warhols
The dB's
Dirty Looks
Donnie Iris and the Cruisers
Doughboys
Dwight Twilley Band

E

Earth Quake
Dave Edmunds
Enuff Z'Nuff
The Exploding Hearts

F

Fall Out Boy
The Feeling
Flamin' Groovies
Flop
Fotomaker
Fountains of Wayne
The Furys
Fuzzbubble

G

Game Theory
Gigolo Aunts
Gin Blossoms
The Go-Go's
Good Charlotte
Nina Gordon
Great Buildings
Green
The Greenberry Woods

H

Pete Ham
Hawks
Head Automatica
Hellogoodbye
Hoodoo Gurus
Hudson Brothers

I

I Fight Dragons
Ima Robot
The Individuals
The Innocents
Donnie Iris

J

The Jags
The Jam
Jellyfish
Jimmy Eat World
Jonas Brothers

K

Kaiser Chiefs
Katrina and the Waves
Tommy Keene
Greg Kihn
The Knack

L

L.E.O.
The Last
Avril Lavigne
Let's Active
Lost Patrol
The Loud Family
Demi Lovato
Nick Lowe
Luxury

M

Chris Mars
Material Issue
Maxïmo Park
The Mayflies USA
McFly
The Merrymakers
The Mice
Milk 'N' Cookies
Morningwood
Motion City Soundtrack
Bob Mould
Myracle Brah

N

Nazz
The Nerves
The New Pornographers
Nikki & the Corvettes

O

Off Broadway
OK Go
Old 97's
One Direction
The Only Ones
The Outfield

P

Paramore
The Paley Brothers
Peachcake
Pezband
Phantom Planet
The Plimsouls
The Posies
Puffy AmiYumi
Punchbuggy
The Pursuit of Happiness

Q
The Quick

R

The Raspberries
The Records
Redd Kross
Emitt Rhodes
Ridel High
Robin Lane & the Chartbusters
Rockpile
The Romantics
Rooney
The Rubinoos
Todd Rundgren

S

Adam Schmitt
The Scruffs
The Semantics
Sex Clark Five
Phil Seymour
The Shins
Shoes
The Sidewinders
Silver Sun
Simple Plan
Sloan
The Smithereens
The Sneetches
The Someloves
Sore Throat
The Speedies
The Spongetones
Rick Springfield
Squeeze
Chris Stamey
The Starjets
Starz
Sugar
The Summer Set
Sunnyboys
Superdrag
Matthew Sweet

T

Tom Petty and the Heartbreakers
Teenage Fanclub
Tinted Windows
Tommy Tutone
The Tourists
Tsar
Dwight Twilley
Two Hours Traffic

U

Universal Honey
Utopia

V

Valley Lodge
The Vapors
Velvet Crush
Kyle Vincent
Mike Viola
Chris Von Sneidern

W

Waterparks
Weezer
The Wellingtons
White Reaper
The Who
The Windbreakers
The Wondermints

X
XTC

Y
Yachts

Z
Zumpano

Songs

See also
List of power pop albums
Lists of musicians
Lists of songs

References

Bibliography

 
Power pop
Power pop